Barceló is a Catalan surname, which originally appeared in Montpellier (Lords of Montpellier), today Languedoc-Roussillon (Southern France) then established in other Crown of Aragon areas like the Balearic Islands (circa 1232) or Catalonia, and finally extended to the rest of Spain and its old territories beyond Europe in America (particularly the Caribbean) and Asia. Variants exist in other languages, e.g. Barcelo and Barsalou in French.

People with the surname
Antonio Barceló (1717–1797), Spanish mariner and Admiral of the Spanish Armada
Clara Barceló, a fictional character in Carlos Ruiz Zafón's novel The Shadow of the Wind
Elia Barceló (born 1957), Spanish-Austrian writer
Hélène Barcelo (born 1954), mathematician from Québec
José Luis Barceló (born 1959), Colombian lawyer and academic
Lorenzo Barceló (born 1977), Dominican Major League Baseball pitcher
Miquel Barceló (writer) (born 1948), Spanish editor, writer and professor
Miquel Barceló (born 1957), Spanish painter
Rich Barcelo (born 1975), American golf player
Roxanne Barcelo (born 1985), Filipina actress
Víctor Manuel Barceló (born 1936), Mexican politician
Maria Gertrudis Barceló (1800–1852), Mexican entrepreneur and gambler
Antonio Rafael Barceló (1868–1938), Puerto Rican politician
Carlos Romero Barceló (1932–2021), Puerto Rican politician, grandson of Antonio

See also
 Barsalou, a French surname

Bibliography
The Barcelo Name in History

References

Surnames